The men's 100 metres event at the 1997 Summer Universiade was held on 28–29 August at the Stadio Cibali in Catania, Italy.

Medalists

Results

Heats
Wind:Heat 5: 0.0 m/s, Heat 9: -1.3 m/s, Heat 10: -2.1 m/s

Quarterfinals
Wind:Heat 1: +0.4 m/s, Heat 2: +0.3 m/s, Heat 3: 0.0 m/s, Heat 4: -0.1 m/s

Semifinals
Wind:Heat 1: +3.9 m/s, Heat 2: +1.9 m/s

Final

Wind: -0.5 m/s

References

Athletics at the 1997 Summer Universiade
1997